The Waipahi River is a river in New Zealand, a tributary of the Pomahaka River.

See also
List of rivers of New Zealand

References

Rivers of Otago
Rivers of New Zealand